Ceratopetalum is a genus of nine species of shrub and tree in the family Cunoniaceae. They are found along the eastern coast of Australia and extend north to New Guinea. Two Australian species are among the best known, one being C. apetalum or coachwood, renowned as a timber tree, and C. gummiferum, the New South Wales Christmas bush.

Both New South Wales Christmas bush (C. gummiferum) and coachwood (C. apetalum) are widespread from south-east Queensland to the south coast of New South Wales, whereas the other extant Australian species are largely confined to high-altitude montane habitats in north-east Australia. These restricted distributions have been hypothesised to be refugia from cycles of changing climate during the Pleistocene.

Species 
Ceratopetalum apetalum D.Don (Coachwood)
Ceratopetalum corymbosum C.T.White
Ceratopetalum gummiferum Sm. (NSW Christmas bush)
Ceratopetalum hylandii Rozefelds & R.W.Barnes
Ceratopetalum iugumensis Rozefelds & R.W.Barnes
Ceratopetalum macrophyllum Hoogland
Ceratopetalum succirubrum C.T.White
Ceratopetalum tetrapterum Mattf.
Ceratopetalum virchowii F.Muell.
†Ceratopetalum suciensis (Campanian)

Fossil evidence
Fossil evidence for Ceratopetalum species has been found in Eocene deposits in South Australia. Named fossil species include Ceratopetalum maslinensis and Ceratopetalum westermannii.

References

 
Oxalidales genera